Wylie Watson (6 February 1889 – 3 May 1966) (born John Wylie Robertson) was a British actor. Among his best-known roles were those of "Mr Memory", an amazing man who commits "50 new facts to his memory every day" in Alfred Hitchcock's film The 39 Steps (1935), and wily storekeeper Joseph Macroon in the Ealing comedy Whisky Galore! (1949). He emigrated to Australia in 1952, and made his final film appearance there in The Sundowners (1960).

Complete filmography

 It's a Great Life (1929) as Bit Role (uncredited)
 For the Love of Mike (1932) as Rev. James
 Leave It to Me (1933) as Rev. Potter
 Hawley's of High Street (1933) as Client
 Road House (1934) as Magician (uncredited)
 The 39 Steps (1935) as Mr. Memory
 The Black Mask (1935) as Jimmie Glass
 Radio Lover (1936) as Joe Morrison
 Please Teacher (1937) as Oswald Clutterbuck
 Why Pick on Me? (1937) as Sam Tippett
 Paradise for Two (1937) as Clarence
 Oh! Letty (1938, TV Movie) as Chester Binney
 Queer Cargo (1938) as Rev. James Travers
 Jamaica Inn (1939) as Salvation Watkins - Sir Humphrey's Gang
 Yes, Madam? (1939) as Albert
 Pack Up Your Troubles (1940) as Eric Sampson
 She Couldn't Say No (1940) as Thrumgood
 Bulldog Sees It Through (1940) as Dancing Professor
 My Wife's Family (1941) as Noah Bagshott
 Danny Boy (1941) as Fiddlestick
 Mr. Proudfoot Shows a Light (1941, Short) as Friend
 From the Four Corners (1942, Short) as Newspaper Vendor (uncredited)
 The Saint Meets the Tiger (1943) as Horace
 The Flemish Farm (1943) as Farmer
 The Lamp Still Burns (1943) as Diabetic Patient
 Tawny Pipit (1944) as Crasker
 Don't Take It to Heart (1944) as Harry Bucket
 Strawberry Roan (1945) as Bill Gurd
 Kiss the Bride Goodbye (1945) as David Dodd
 The World Owes Me a Living (1945) as Conductor
 Waterloo Road (1945) as Tattooist
 Don Chicago (1945) as Peabody
 Waltz Time (1945) as Josef
 Murder in Reverse? (1945) as Tailor
 The Trojan Brothers (1946) as Stage Manager
 The Years Between (1946) as Venning
 A Girl in a Million (1946) as Peabody
 Temptation Harbour (1947) as Fred
 Fame Is the Spur (1947) as Pendleton
 Brighton Rock (1948) as Spicer
 My Brother Jonathan (1948) as Bagley
 Tell Her the Truth (1948, TV Movie) as Parkin
 London Belongs to Me (1948) as Mr. Josser
 No Room at the Inn (1948) as Councilor Green
 Things Happen at Night (1948) as Watson, the butler
 The History of Mr. Polly (1949) as Mr. Rusper
 Whisky Galore! (1949) as Joseph Macroon
 Train of Events (1949) (uncredited)
 Your Witness (1950) as Mr. Widgery, Red Lion Proprietor
 Madeleine (1950) as Huggins (uncredited)
 Morning Departure (1950) as Able Seaman Nobby Clark
 Shadow of the Past (1950) as Caretaker
 The Magnet (1950) as Pickering
 Happy Go Lovely (1951) as Stage Door Keeper
 The Sundowners (1960) as Herb Johnson (final film role)

References

External links
 

Scottish male film actors
1889 births
1966 deaths
20th-century Scottish male actors
Scottish emigrants to Australia
People from Lanarkshire